Maretz is a commune in the Nord department in northern France. It is 22 km south east of Cambrai. As of 2019, the population is 1,444.

Heraldry

See also
Communes of the Nord department

References

Communes of Nord (French department)